Magik One: First Flight is the first album in the Magik series by trance artist DJ Tiësto, released on September, 1997 in the Netherlands. It was re-released in 2001. As with the rest of the Magik series, the album is a live turntable mix.

This album and its three sequels became infamous after it occurred that Tiësto and his record company illegally used Patrick Woodroffe's paintings for covers.

Track listing
Mixed Version
 Sunday Club – "Healing Dream" – 7:05
 Lock – "Into The Sun" – 4:29
 Clear View – "Never Enough" – 4:15
 Channel Tribe – "Program 1" – 3:32
 Jake & Jesse – "Low Turbulence" – 4:29
 Mockba – "Shell Shock" – 2:49
 Allure – "When She Left" – 4:27
 Mac Zimms – "L'Annonce Des Couleurs" – 5:51
 Stray Dog – "Chapter Two" (Southsquare Mix) – 4:27
 The Voyager – "Back On Earth" – 5:46
 DJ Tiësto – "Long Way Home" – 3:16
 Silent Breed – "Sync In" – 4:30
 Club Quake – "Vicious Circle" – 3:25
 Viper 2 – "Titty Twister" – 4:27
 Qattara – "The Truth" (Coufsat Mix) – 6:43
 DJ Sakin – "Blue Sky" – 4:16

Unmixed Version
 Sunday Club – "Healing Dream" – 11:45
 Lock – "Into The Sun" – 8:58
 Clear View – "Never Enough" – 8:00
 Channel Tribe – "Program 1" – 6:28
 Jake & Jesse – "Low Turbulence" – 8:41
 Mockba – "Shell Shock" – 6:45
 Allure – "When She Left" – 5:21
 Mac Zimms – "L'Annonce Des Couleurs" – 8:42
 Stray Dog – "Chapter Two" (Southsquare Mix) – 6:49
 The Voyager – "Back On Earth" – 9:52
 DJ Tiësto – "Long Way Home" – 6:32
 Silent Breed – "Sync In" – 5:56
 Club Quake – "Vicious Circle" – 6:02
 Viper 2 – "Titty Twister" – 7:03
 Qattara – "The Truth" (Coufsat Mix) – 9:04
 DJ Sakin – "Blue Sky" – 6:46

Tiësto compilation albums
1997 compilation albums
Black Hole Recordings albums